The 2008 Historic Grand Prix of Monaco was the sixth running of the Historic Grand Prix of Monaco, a motor racing event for heritage Grand Prix, Voiturettes, Formula One, Formula Two and Sports cars.

Report 

Entered for Race B was the Maserati 250F with which Stirling Moss had won the 1956 Monaco Grand Prix. The car was driven by Peter Heuberger but did not start the race. A battle between Duncan Dayton and Joaquín Folch-Rusiñol ended prematurely for Folch-Rusiñol, leaving second place to be decided by a fierce battle between Barrie Baxter and Tony Smith.

In Race C, Moss made his seventh and final competitive appearance at the event, at the wheel of a Frazer Nash. He wrote an entry in Motor Sport describing how the circuit had changed since his first visit, and expressed some disappointment at how lenient the track limits had become since then. In the race, fifth place was hotly contested between the powerful Ferrari 340 America of Michael Willms and the nimble Cooper T21 of Simon Diffey, the two cars being faster on different parts of the circuit but evenly matched on overall pace: their best laps were separated by just 0.028 s.

2008 represented the fiftieth anniversary of Formula Junior, a series that had been introduced in 1958 to encourage a new generation of racing drivers and whose annual Monaco race, supporting the Grand Prix, was one of the most prestigious events for young drivers. Formula Junior would also become the subject of the first historic motorsport series in 1975. Anniversary celebrations were held across the globe throughout 2008, and the event at Monaco (Race D) commemorated the first Formula Junior race at Monaco, held in 1959 and won by Michael May. A notable entrant in Race D was Tony Goodwin, whose long racing career includes an appearance in the 1964 Monaco Formula Three Race, where he had finished twelfth. In this event, he qualified on pole position and finished second. Jean Guittard made his first Historic Grand Prix of Monaco appearance in this race; in subsequent events, he would race under the pseudonym "Mister John of B".

Entered for Race F was a Ferrari 312 which had been raced by Chris Amon during the 1968 Formula One season. It was purchased and restored specifically for the event, which was thought to be its first competitive outing since 1969. Frank Sytner qualified fourth and stayed there most of the race, only to retire on the penultimate lap. Hamish Sommerville ran fifth but retired after seven laps.

Making his debut at the event was Bobby Verdon-Roe, driving a McLaren M26 in Race G. He crashed in the tunnel during practice, bringing his weekend to an end along with that of David Clark, who could not avoid the debris. Verdon-Roe would make up for this accident by dominating the 2010 event from pole position. Mauro Pane took the lead into the first corner but polesitter Paul Edwards kept him under intense pressure, eventually forcing a mistake that let Edwards through. Pane hit the barrier hard, but was able to continue to second place.

Results

Summary

Série A: Pre 1947 Grand Prix Cars

Série B: Pre 1961 front engined Grand Prix cars

Série C: Pre 1953 Sports and Sports Prototype Cars

Série D: Formula Junior

Série E: Pre 1966 Rear Engined Grand Prix Cars

Série F: Pre 1975 Formula 1 - 3 litre

Série G: Formula 1 - 3 litre from 1975 to 1978

References 

Historic motorsport events
Monaco Grand Prix
Historic Grand Prix of Monaco
Historic Grand Prix of Monaco